Thorill Gylder (born 5 May 1958) is a Norwegian female former racewalking athlete and speaker. A member of Vansjø/Svinndal IL sports club, she competed from the mid-1970s to the early 1980s. She competed three times at the IAAF World Race Walking Cup and after a fourth-place finish in 1975 she took the 5 km walk bronze medal in 1979.

She broke several world records in walking during her career. She took the 20 kilometres walk world record with a time of 1:43:20 hours in 1978. This stood for nearly two years until it was beaten by Sue Cook. She twice broke the 10 km walk world record, setting a time of 48:40 minutes in 1978 before knocking over a minute off that with 47:24 minutes in 1979. Sue Cook was again the athlete to better Gylder's record, doing so in 1980. She also broke the 5000 metres race walk world record at Bislett Stadium in 1978.

Gylder gained her first international experiences at regional level. She was a minor medallist at junior level at the Nordic Race Walking Championships in 1973 and 1975, behind Sweden's Siv Gustavsson and Monica Karlsson. She took her first senior medal at the competition (a bronze) in 1975 behind Swedes Margareta Simu and Elisabeth Olsson –this made her only the second Norwegian to medal after 1971 winner Thorhild Sarpebakken. She also took a silver medal indoors in the 3000 m walk at the 1978 Nordic Indoor Race Walking Championships, with Simu again topping the podium.

Gylder was the dominant female walker nationally during her career, taking six consecutive 5000 metres race walk titles from 1975 to 1980 and seven straight titles in the 10 kilometres race walk discipline. Her victories followed on from those of her sister, Gerd Gylder, who was also an international walker for Norway.

International competitions

National titles
Norwegian Athletics Championships
5000 m walk: 1975, 1976, 1977, 1978, 1979, 1980
10 km walk: 1975, 1976, 1977, 1978, 1979, 1980, 1981

References

Living people
1958 births
Norwegian female racewalkers
World record setters in athletics (track and field)